Ernest Samuel 'Sammy' Ogg (1906-1969) was an Australian rugby league footballer who played in the 1920s and 1930s. He played in the New South Wales Rugby League premiership for University, whom he also captained.

Background
Ogg was born at Camperdown, New South Wales on 30 December 1906.

Playing career
While obtaining his medical degree at the University of Sydney, he joined the University Rugby League team in 1925 and played a total of nine seasons with them between 1925 and 1933. He played second row in the 1926 Grand Final loss to South Sydney.

He later went on to captain the team during his later years as a player. He played 118 first grade games, scoring 24 tries and kicking 18 goals during his career.  Ogg is the record appearance holder for the University club.  He claimed five Wooden Spoon's whilst at University as the club struggled on the field for a number of years.

Post playing
Ogg became a doctor in Sydney and later the chief Coroner of New South Wales.

Death
Ogg died at Dover Heights, Sydney on 8 July 1969.

References

1906 births
Australian rugby league players
Sydney University rugby league team players
1969 deaths
Rugby league second-rows
Rugby league players from Sydney